is a Japanese women's professional shogi player ranked 3-dan.

Promotion history
Honda's promotion history  is as follows.
 2-kyū: April 1, 1992
 1-kyū: April 1, 1993
 1-dan: April 1, 1999
 2-dan: May 19, 2004
 3-dan: September 26, 2012

Note: All ranks are women's professional ranks.

Titles and other championships
Honda's only appearance in a women's major title match came in when she unsuccessfully challenged Momoko Katō for the 2nd  title in 2012.

References

External links
 ShogiHub: Sayuri, Honda

Japanese shogi players
Living people
Women's professional shogi players
1978 births
People from Mito, Ibaraki
Professional shogi players from Ibaraki Prefecture